Jordan Williams (born November 23, 1994) is a professional Canadian football linebacker for the Toronto Argonauts of the Canadian Football League (CFL). He was originally drafted first overall in the 2020 CFL Draft by the BC Lions. He played college football for the East Carolina Pirates.

High school career
Because his mother was in the military, Williams moved around frequently in his youth, including Baltimore and Pennsylvania. Williams was a three-year letterwinner at Jack Britt High School in Fayetteville, North Carolina. He was twice an All-Mid-South 4-A Conference selection. However, his collegiate options were limited due to academic issues.

College career
Williams joined East Carolina as a preferred walk-on after transferring from Shaw University as a freshman. He earned a scholarship and played nine games on special teams in the 2014 season as a redshirt freshman. Williams finished second in tackles with 81 as a sophomore. As a junior, he led the team in tackles with 77.  Williams finished second on the team in tackles with 89 as a senior in 2017, including three for a loss and a forced fumble. In his career, Williams started 25 of 45 games and posted 252 tackles (123 solo), 13.0 tackles for loss, 3.0 sacks, two forced fumbles, three pass breakups and an interception. Williams also contributed 11 double-digit tackle performances. He earned a bachelor's degree from ECU in Health & Communications minor.

Professional career

Early career 
Williams received an invite to the San Francisco 49ers Camp in 2018 but did not make the team. He continued to train and received Canadian citizenship. He nearly joined the Ottawa Redblacks out of training camp in 2019, but was convinced to enter the CFL Draft since his mother was Canadian.

BC Lions 
Williams was drafted first overall in the 2020 CFL Draft by the BC Lions. The number one pick was originally held by the Ottawa Redblacks, who dealt the pick the Calgary Stampeders, who subsequently traded the pick to the Lions on draft day. He did not play in 2020 due to the cancellation of the 2020 CFL season and was officially signed by the Lions on May 5, 2021. Williams had an outstanding 2021 season with the Lions, and set a CFL record for most defensive tackles in a season by a Canadian rookie with 92, surpassing the previous high of 75 set by Mike O'Shea in 1993. Following his impressive 2021 season, Williams was named the CFL's Most Outstanding Rookie and was just the second number one draft pick to win the award.

Toronto Argonauts
On February 9, 2023, it was announced that Williams had been traded to the Toronto Argonauts in exchange for a first-round pick in the 2023 CFL Draft.

References

External links
 Toronto Argonauts bio
 East Carolina Pirates bio

1994 births
Living people
Canadian football linebackers
American players of Canadian football
American football linebackers
East Carolina Pirates football players
Players of American football from North Carolina
People from Fayetteville, North Carolina
BC Lions players
American sportspeople of Canadian descent
Canadian Football League Rookie of the Year Award winners
Toronto Argonauts players